Castellterçol is a town in Catalonia. It is in the province of Barcelona, in the comarca of Moianès; until May 2015 it was in Vallès Oriental. , the population was 2,402.

References

External links
 Government data pages 

Municipalities in Moianès